Korean Chemistry Olympiad(KChO,한국화학올림피아드) is a chemistry olympiad held by Korean Chemical Society (KCS). It is also one of the Korean Science Olympiad. The top four contestants of the KChO can join the International Chemistry Olympiad(IChO).

History 
In 1991, Korean Chemical Society held the first KChO. Four high school students representing South Korea joined the 24th IChO the next year, which was held in United States. KChO was held 27 times. In 2018, 50th IChO was held at Slovakia, Czech Republic.

Business Background and Supports

Business Background 
The KCS holds the KChO to make South Korea win the IChO and through four seasonal schools, KCS will find who are gifted in chemistry and educate them to play an important role in development of chemistry in Korean society.

Supports 
Korea Foundation for the Science and Creativity, LG Chem, and Korea Dow Chemical Company supports the KChO.

Process

On-line questions 
KCS Uploads about five to six questions every two weeks on KChO website. Students who are studying for KChO can download the questions and try to solve them. Anyone can download the answers and official solutions there after a week. Even if the person is not joining the KChO, the person can download the questions and answers at the KChO website.

Test 1 
After the on-line questions, students will take a test about what they have learned while solving the on-line questions. First grade students in high school take this test. The questions are based on basic chemistry. The test can determine how much the students understand basic chemistry. 80 well-ranked students can join the Summer school 1. About one organic chemistry questions appear in the test. All the tests are held in Konkuk University.

Summer school 1 
80 people who got a good score will join the Summer School 1, which is usually held far away from Seoul. In the school, students learn basic chemistry for two weeks and there isn't any experiment classes. When the school is almost finished, students take an exam. One person gets a Best Graduation, 24 people get a Merit, and some of the rest get an Honorable Mention. 25 people-Best Graduation and Merit-can join the Winter School 1 without Test 2. In 2018, the Summer School will be held at Daegu Gyeongbuk Institute of Science and Technology.

Test 2 
On-line Questions are uploaded again after the Summer School. The leftovers of the Summer School and other people who didn't join the Summer School have to take this test to join the Winter School 1. First grade students in the high school take this test. In this test, Organic Chemistry questions will appear more often than the test 1. 25 well-ranked students can join the Winter School 1.

Winter school 1 
25 people directly from the Summer School 1 and 25 people from the Test 2 will join the Winter School 1, which is usually held near Seoul. In the school, students stay two weeks; studying theories in the morning and learning experiments in afternoon. Half of them of theories are related to basic chemistry and the other half will be related to Organic Chemistry. One person gets a Best Graduation, 19 people get a Merit, and some of the rest get an Honorable Mention. 20 people-Best Graduation and Merit-can join the Summer School 2 without Test 3.

Test 3 
On-line Questions are uploaded again after the Winter School. The leftovers of the Winter School and other people who didn't join the Winter School have to take this test to join the Summer School 2. Second grade students in the high school take this test. In this test, almost half of these questions will be related to Organic Chemistry. 20 well-ranked students can join the Winter School 2.

Summer school 2 
20 people directly from the Winter School 1 and 20 people from the Test 3 will join the Summer School 2, which is held at the same place with Summer School 1. In the school, students stay two weeks; studying theories in the morning and learning experiments in afternoon. Almost of the theories are related to Organic Chemistry. One person gets a Best Graduation, 14 people get a Merit, and some of the leftovers get an Honorable Mention. 15 people-Best Graduation and Merit-can join the Winter School 2. These students have to take the Test 4, but the result doesn't matter of choosing students joining the Test 4. They can directly go to the Winter School 2.

Test 4 
On-line Questions are being uploaded again after the Summer School. All students-even the directly connected ones-have to take this test to become the final representatives. Second grade students in the high school take this test. This test is counted 20 percent when KCS chooses the final representatives of South Korea. In this test, most of the questions are related to Organic Chemistry. 15 students directly connected from the Summer School 2 and 15 students who got a good score in the Test 4 can join the Winter School 2.

Winter school 2 
15 people directly from the Summer School 2 and 15 people from the Test 4 will join the Winter School 2, which is held at the same place with Winter School 2. In the school, students stay only a week; studying theories in the morning and learning experiments in afternoon. Almost all of the theories are related to Organic Chemistry. The test held in this school will count 80 percent when KCS chooses the final representatives of South Korea. One person will get a Best Graduation, about 10 people will get a Merit, and some of the rest will get an Honorable Mention. All the forty people can take the Korean Representative Choosing Exam(Final KChO).

Final representative selection process 
After graduating the Winter school 2, students take Final KChO. It is held on January or February. It is divided into two parts; Theories and Experiments. Organic Chemistry and Inorganic Chemistry questions in the theory are important for choosing the representatives. In the experiment, students solve one Organic Chemistry experiment and one Quantitative Chemistry experiment. Four students who got a high score represents South Korea in IChO. If all the four representatives are the same gender, the student who got a highest score between the other gender who ranked eighth or higher becomes the representative instead of the fourth student.

Representatives of IChO of Korea

References 

Youth science
Student quiz competitions
Chemistry competitions
Education competitions in South Korea
Science events in South Korea